Aegidientorplatz is a Hannover Stadtbahn station on lines B and C. The station is located beneath Aegidientorplatz, one of the squares in Hanover Mitte.

Aegidientorplatz is the only station where passengers can change from B lines to C lines on the same platform.

References

Hanover Stadtbahn stations